The  U.S. Coast Guard Cutter Oak (WLB 211) is a United States Coast Guard seagoing buoy tender; the second of her name and the eleventh of the Juniper class. Home ported in Newport, Rhode Island the "Maine Responder" maintains Aids to Navigation (ATON) along the rugged New England coastline, promoting economic security through navigation safety of the Marine Transportation System. A multi-mission platform, the cutter can also support search & rescue, domestic icebreaking, living marine resources maritime law enforcement, environmental protection, national defense and homeland security missions. The cutter occasionally assists with maintenance support of the National Oceanic and Atmospheric Administration (NOAA) National Data Buoy Center's offshore weather buoys.

Construction and characteristics

USCGC Oak was built by the Marinette Marine Corporation in Wisconsin, launched on 26 January 2002 and commissioned in March 2003. Oak is propelled by two Caterpillar diesel engines rated at 3,100 horsepower, and has a top speed of 16 knots. She has a single controllable-pitch propeller, which along with bow and stern thrusters, allow the ship to be maneuvered to set buoys close offshore and in restricted waters. A dynamic global positioning system coupled with machinery plant controls and a chart display and information system allow station-keeping of the ship with an accuracy of within five meters of the planned position without human intervention. The cutter has a 2,875 square foot buoy deck area with a crane that is used for servicing large ocean buoys.

Mission

USCGC Oak has an area of responsibility within the First Coast Guard District which covers the northeast United States, up to the Canadian border. While her primary mission is servicing aids-to-navigation (ATON), the ship can also support search & rescue, domestic icebreaking, living marine resources maritime law enforcement, environmental protection, national defense and homeland security missions. The crew also assists the National Oceanic & Atmospheric Administration (NOAA) National Data Buoy Center maintain offshore weather buoys critical to mariner safety at sea.

History
The keel for the Oak was laid on 30 July 2001 at Marinette Marine Corporation in Marinette, Wisconsin. Oak was launched on 26 January 2002. The ship's sponsor was Mrs. Billye Brown, wife of Congressman Henry E. Brown (R-SC). Initially home ported in Charleston, South Carolina, Oak was the first Coast Guard cutter to be commissioned following the creation of the Department of Homeland Security. Oak was also the first to complete a 16 month mid-life maintenance availability and homeport shift, moving to Newport in November 2016.

See also

 USCG seagoing buoy tender

Notes
Citations

References used

External links

 

2002 ships
Navigational aids
Juniper-class seagoing buoy tenders
Ships built by Marinette Marine
Ships of the United States Coast Guard